SM UC-9 was a German Type UC I minelayer submarine or U-boat in the German Imperial Navy during World War I. The U-boat had been ordered by November 1914 and was launched on 11 July 1915. She was commissioned into the German Imperial Navy on 15 July 1915 as SM UC-9. Mines laid by UC-9 in her two patrols were not credited with sinking any ships. UC-9 was lost 21 October 1915 to one of its own mines.

Design
A German Type UC I submarine, UC-9 had a displacement of  when at the surface and  while submerged. The submarine was powered by one Daimler-Motoren-Gesellschaft six-cylinder, four-stroke diesel engine producing , an electric motor producing , and one propeller shaft.

UC-9 was fitted with six  mine tubes, twelve UC 120 mines, and one  machine gun. She was built by AG Vulcan Stettin and her complement was fourteen crew members.

Notes

References

Bibliography

 
 

German Type UC I submarines
U-boats commissioned in 1915
World War I submarines of Germany
U-boats sunk in 1915
1915 ships
World War I minelayers of Germany
Ships built in Hamburg
World War I shipwrecks in the North Sea
Ships lost with all hands